Pristensky District is an administrative and municipal district (raion), one of the twenty-eight in Kursk Oblast, Russia. It is located in the south of the oblast. Its administrative center is the urban locality (a work settlement) of Pristen. Population:  21,249 (2002 Census);  The population of Pristen accounts for 34.3% of the district's total population.

References

Notes

Sources

Districts of Kursk Oblast